Flight Control is a time management video game for iOS, Wii, Nintendo DS, Android, and Windows Phone 7 developed by Firemint and first released for iOS on March 5, 2009. The app was a number one bestseller on the App Store in 19 countries simultaneously on April 6, 2009 and has sold over 3.8 million copies. The development and publishing of Flight Control on non-Apple mobile phones is being handled by Namco under license.

An HD version of the game called Flight Control HD was released for the iPad in March 2010 and for the PlayStation 3 on the PlayStation Network (supporting the PlayStation Move controller) on September 15, 2010. The PlayStation 3 version supports exclusive additional features including a stereoscopic 3D mode, 1080p resolution, four player co-operative multiplayer, as well as an exclusive new map, Metropolis, which features a day and night cycle.  Flight Control HD was also ported to the Microsoft Windows and OS X operating systems and made available through Steam. These releases are similar to the iPad version aside from the addition of a new airfield. The Mac version was released via the Mac App Store on July 21, 2011.

In September 2015, the iOS version was removed for sale from the App Store, although it remains for sale on Android.

Gameplay
Players assume the role of an air traffic controller at an extremely busy airport. The airport features a runway for large red jets, a runway for small yellow planes and a helipad for blue helicopters.  Players draw paths along the field to direct each aircraft to its designated landing zone. Each successfully landed aircraft scores the player one point, and as the player's score increases, so does the number of aircraft that will appear on the screen simultaneously. The game ends when two or more aircraft collide. Players receive a high score for the most planes landed, which can be uploaded to online leaderboards using Firemint's cloudcell technology as well as to those in the iOS Game Center.  The 1.2 version update includes four additional types of aircraft and two new stages (a beach and an aircraft carrier). The 1.3 version update includes the use of Bluetooth to enable multiplayer via a second device. The 1.5 update includes a new Australian Outback map which includes airplanes from the Royal Flying Doctor Service of Australia that cannot be redirected.

Update 1.7, released on May 11, 2010, completely overhauls the graphical engine to add higher quality animations and more vibrant detail to the game.  For fans of the Flight Control theme song, the 1.7 update extends the length of the title screen melody.  A new fast forward feature called 'Safe Fast Forward' has also been included.  Safe Fast Forward slows the game down to normal speed when a plane crash is imminent, allowing the player more time to prevent it.  'Windy Airfield' is a newly added airfield which only allows the player to land planes on runways that face into the wind.  Runways that face the same direction as the wind are closed until the wind changes.  A windsock indicates which direction the wind is coming from.  The latest update brings the playable runway total to five.

Sales
Flight Control has been the number one downloaded paid application in over 20 countries. It has sold over 3.8 million copies worldwide.

Reception
Flight Control has received generally positive reviews. IGN gave the game 8 out of 10, praising its long lasting gameplay. Pocket Gamer also gave the game 8 out of 10, complimenting, "if you could put Flight Control in a needle, it'd be considered a Class A drug. That's how simple and addictive it is." Pocket Gamer awarded it Best Casual/Puzzle Game for iPhone in 2010.

Sequel
On March 15, 2012, Firemint, now a part of EA, released Flight Control Rocket.

References

External links
 

2009 video games
Android (operating system) games
DSiWare games
IOS games
MacOS games
PlayStation 3 games
PlayStation Move-compatible games
PlayStation Network games
Video games developed in Australia
WiiWare games
Windows games
Windows Phone games
Casual games
Time management video games